Walter Cyril Deakon (24 May 1924 – 5 October 1982) was a Liberal party member of the House of Commons of Canada. He was born in Edmonton, Alberta and became a barrister, solicitor and professional engineer by career.

Deakon was a member of the Royal Canadian Air Force from 1943 to 1945 during World War II. He studied at Ryerson Polytechnical Institute, University of Toronto and the Osgoode Hall Law School, attaining Bachelor of Applied Science and Professional Engineer degrees.

He was first elected in the High Park riding in the 1968 general election. Deakon served only one term in office, the 28th Canadian Parliament, before being defeated in the 1972 election by Otto Jelinek of the Progressive Conservative party as the riding then became known as High Park—Humber Valley.

References

External links
 

1924 births
1982 deaths
Canadian military personnel of World War II
Liberal Party of Canada MPs
Members of the House of Commons of Canada from Ontario
Politicians from Edmonton
Lawyers in Ontario
Toronto Metropolitan University alumni
University of Toronto alumni